The JŽ series 461 is a six-axle electric locomotive built in Romania for Yugoslav Railways. Today there are known as ŽS series 461 in Serbia, ŽCG series 461 in Montenegro and MŽ series 461 with Macedonian railways.

History
This series is originally based on the SJ Rb built the Swedish company ASEA, later made with licence by the Electroputere Craiova works for the Romanian Railways starting in 1965, called the EA series, with a similar design made for the Norwegian Railways, the El 15.  The 103 electric locomotives had been produced by Electroputere from Craiova in two subseries for Yugoslav Railway. First subseries, JŽ 461-0 consisted from 45 locomotives build from 1971 to 1973. Second subseries, JŽ 461-1 was built from 1978 until 1980 and it consisted from 58 locomotives. Romania delivered to Yugoslavia a number of 103 Co'Co locomotives of the 461 JŽ series. These locomotives were made in exchange to a number of JŽ series 441 based units, made by RK Zagreb and MIN Niš for the CFR, delivered between 1973 and 1984 and known as the EC series in the CFR classification.

Operators
After dissolution of Yugoslavia, 461 class have remain in service with railways of Serbia, Montenegro and North Macedonia. Today there are 46 locomotives operated by Serbian Railways. Most Serbian locomotives were passed to the cargo division in 2015, with 5 units retained for passenger trains on the Belgrade-Bar line. Railway transport of Montenegro operates 10 and Montecargo 8 locomotives of class 461, being only electric locomotive operated in Montenegro. This series is mainly used on Belgrade–Bar railway by both Serbian and Montenegrin railways. Six locomotives of 461 series are operated by Macedonian Railways, with two of them modernised and thyristorized to series 462.

Voltage 
This locomotive utilises 25 kV/50 Hz AC.

Liveries 
Originally 461 series locomotives were painted in grey livery with blue base and line, at the time the standard livery for EA series electrics in Romania. Overhauled Montenegrin locomotives are painted in red and yellow with white stripes, with "Željeznice Crne Gore A.D." inscription in it, and, the non- overhauled ones are painted in red and blue, with white stripes. All refurbished class 461 locomotives of Serbian Railways have red and greyish-blue livery which is the same as for other electric locomotives operated -  441 and 444 series.

Gallery

See also 
 Belgrade-Bar railway
 Rail transport in Montenegro

References

External links 

 Characteristics and some description
 461 series (Serbian)

Co′Co′ locomotives
25 kV AC locomotives
461
Railway locomotives introduced in 1971
Standard gauge locomotives of Yugoslavia
Standard gauge locomotives of Serbia
Standard gauge locomotives of Montenegro
Standard gauge locomotives of North Macedonia
Electroputere locomotives
Co′Co′ electric locomotives of Europe